Beth Nicole Hagendorf is an American actress, television producer, and television host. She starred on Discovery Channel’s TV series "Fire in the Hole." Hagendorf was the host for TV show "Drifting with The All Stars" on  Velocity (TV channel). She is also known for her bikini contests in bodybuilding and her appearances in Flex Magazine.

Early life
Beth Hagendorf was raised on a 6,000-acre cattle ranch, Tait Ranch, in Columbus, Texas. She grew up a sporty tomboy, riding 4-wheelers, and running wild on the ranch. Hagendorf's mother died at the age of 49 after battling cancer for seven brave years.  Hagendorf graduated from Texas A&M University in 3 years with a Bachelor of Science in Sociology and minor in Psychology.

Career
In 2011, she moved to La Jolla California and entered her first NPC contest. That year on New Year's Eve she was scouted by a model management company at a La Jolla restaurant and that began her modeling career. May 12, 2012, Hagendorf earned her Bikini Champion title in the INBA. In July 2012, Hagendorf won Flex Magazine bikini model search.  In 2012, Hagendorf began her acting career when cast in a straight-to-video horror film, "Four Square," and was the TV show host of "The Talk of San Diego."   In late 2013, she was cast to host the TV show "Drifting with The All Stars." Discovery Channel's TV series "Fire in the Hole" followed an explosives company, Hagendorf is affiliated with. She has now recreated an explosives television series in development.

Filmography

Competition history

Political
Hagendorf associates herself with the Libertarian Party (United States).

Personal life
Hagendorf is single, she currently lives in Pacific Palisades CA.

References

External links
Official Website
Beth Hagendorf on Facebook
Beth Hagendorf on Twitter
Beth Hagendorf on Instagram
Beth Hagendorf on YouTube

Discovery Channel people
American television actresses
American female models
American women television producers
Fitness and figure competitors
Texas A&M University alumni
Living people
Year of birth missing (living people)
21st-century American women